The Louis Armstrong Award, or sometimes the King Bee Award, is the "top senior jazz award" or highest level interscholastic award given to students at high schools in the United States. It is given in recognition of "outstanding musical achievement and an incredible dedication to the program". There is only one recipient per high school per year, unless there is a tie.

History
Louis Armstrong was an American jazz musician and singer. Armstrong's influence extends well beyond jazz music, and by the end of his career in the 1960s, he was widely regarded as a profound influence on popular music in general.  Lucille Armstrong, his wife in later years, described his love for people. "Louis's greatest personality traits were humility and generosity. He just loved people, and he always tried to understand them too. He was compassionate, generous, and understanding with everyone. He was loved, not only for his style, but as a person as well."

The Louis Armstrong award was inaugurated in 1974, with the consent of Armstrong's widow, shortly after he died in 1971.

Notable award recipients

Andrea Brachfeld
Evan Christopher 
Benjamin Clapp
Shaun Foist
Taku Hirano
Brian Ladd (of Blackhouse)
John Mayer
Pat Metheny
John Myung
Nick Offerman
Trey Parker
John Petrucci
Michael Robinson
Joe Don Rooney
Mark Smucker
Steve Vai
Dave Weckl

References

External links
 Louis Armstrong award

American music awards
Louis Armstrong